Polar Boy is a fictional character from the 30th century of the DC Universe, initially suggested by reader Buddy Lavigne of Northbrook, Illinois in the letters page of Adventure Comics #304, from January 1963. He was the first of several characters in this era who were created based on reader suggestions.

Fictional character biography
Brek Bannin grew up on the planet Tharr which is considered one of the hottest inhabited planets in the galaxy. Bannin's family lives in the hottest valley of the planet where the inhabitants developed the power to create super cold, snow and ice as a way to combat the persistent heat.

He first tried out for the Legion in Adventure Comics #306 but was unable to control his powers. He was rejected because members felt his powers might interfere in missions. Bannin then started the Legion of Substitute Heroes with other rejected applicants, and was their first leader.

He was the youngest person to ever try out for the Legion. He and the Subs aided the Legion numerous times mostly as local law enforcement while the Legion was off-world. In later appearances the Subs were used as comic relief. After the Subs successfully thwarted an invasion of Bismoll by duplicates of Computo the Conqueror, in an embarrassing inept fashion, he disbanded the Subs. His work with the Subs had earned him a waiver to the Legion's rule that new members must be under 18, and he joined the regular Legion, eventually becoming elected their leader and staying with them until they disbanded.

Members of the Subs were given a waiver to the Legion's rule that new members must not be older than 18. After the Subs disbanded Polar Boy applied for full membership in the Legion. He was accepted and inducted along with Sensor Girl, Magnetic Kid, Tellus, and Quislet.

Polar Boy was often characterized as well-meaning but overeager by Legion writers. He was almost always illustrated as being considerably shorter than the other Legionnaires.

In an alternate timeline noted by Waverider, the original Polar Boy successfully recruits the time-lost Justice League hero Blue Jay.

Post-Zero Hour
Following the Zero Hour reboot, Polar Boy was reintroduced in Legionnaires #43 (Dec 1996), in which he was once more rejected for unstable powers, and formed the Substitute Legion. It was mentioned that this incarnation was not younger than the other Legion candidates, but was assumed to be such due to his height.

"Threeboot"
Polar Boy appears in the "Threeboot" Legion as a member of the Wanderers. His powers are described as "slowing molecular movement".

Post-Infinite Crisis
In Action Comics #860, Polar Boy is seen in a torture camp, captured by the anti-alien society of 31st century Earth. His arm had been ripped off, but upon his release by Superman and the Legion, he created a replacement out of ice.

In Final Crisis: Legion of 3 Worlds, Polar Boy is among the Legionnaires assembled against Superboy-Prime and the new Legion of Super-Villains. To combat this threat, Brainiac 5 sends Ryan, Dawnstar and Wildfire on an undisclosed mission to the 21st century. Returning to present with a strand of Lex Luthor's hair (which the Legion use to revive Conner Kent), Polar Boy engages Superboy-Prime, trying to hold him off long enough for Brainiac 5's experiment to work. He is nearly killed by Prime, but is saved by Sun Boy.

Powers and abilities
Polar Boy, like any Tharrian, can reduce the heat around himself or other objects, creating a drop in temperature ranging from mild to intense. Because of this, Bannin can withstand hotter than normal temperatures. Usually, when he makes an item very cold, ice or frost will condense on its surface. He often wears warm clothes due to the cooler temperatures on Earth.

In other media
Polar Boy makes non-speaking appearances in the animated series Legion of Super Heroes.

References

Characters created by Edmond Hamilton
Characters created by John Forte
Comics characters introduced in 1963
DC Comics metahumans
DC Comics superheroes
Fictional characters with ice or cold abilities